Ramsamy is a Mauritian surname. Notable people with the name include:
 Jean-Régis Ramsamy (born 1966), French television journalist
 Prega Ramsamy (born 1950), Mauritian politician
 Sam Ramsamy (born 1938), South African activist and sports administrator

References 

Surnames of Mauritian origin